Live from Rome is a solo studio album by American hip hop artist Sole. It was released on Anticon in 2005.

Critical reception

At Metacritic, which assigns a weighted average score out of 100 to reviews from mainstream critics, the album received an average score of 62, based on 9 reviews, indicating "generally favorable reviews".

Brian Howe of Pitchfork gave the album a 6.9 out of 10 and said, "Sole's socialist screeds work well when he raps them like he means them instead of couching them in layers of affected irony." Dave Segal of XLR8R called it "Sole's most accomplished opus yet." Meanwhile, Mike Schiller of PopMatters gave the album 3 stars out of 10, saying, "One or two songs in, the listener is convinced that Sole has something interesting to say; fifteen songs later, he's just an angry young man shouting about whatever."

Track listing

Personnel
Credits adapted from liner notes.

 Sole – vocals, mixing (5, 15, 17)
 Jel – additional vocals (1)
 Pedestrian – additional vocals (1)
 Odd Nosdam – production (1, 4, 10–13), mixing (1, 4, 6, 10–13, 15, 17), additional production (7), additional mixing (7)
 Alias – production (2, 7, 8, 14), mixing (7, 14)
 Jeremy Goody – mixing (2, 3, 8, 9)
 Controller 7 – production (3, 9)
 Yasamin – production (5)
 Telephone Jim Jesus – production (6)
 Bleubird – vocals (12)
 Tepr – production (15, 17)
 Matt – production (16), mixing (16)
 George Horn – mastering

References

External links
 

2005 albums
Sole (hip hop artist) albums
Anticon albums
Albums produced by Alias (musician)
Albums produced by Odd Nosdam